The 2017 Men's Indoor Pan American Cup was the seventh edition of the Men's Indoor Pan American Cup, the quadrennial international men's indoor hockey championship of the Americas organized by the Pan American Hockey Federation. It was held alongside the women's tournament in Georgetown, Guyana from 16 to 21 October 2017.

The winners of the tournament qualified for the 2018 Men's and Women's Hockey World Cup respectively.

Results
All times are local (UTC−04:00).

Pool matches

Classification matches

Fifth and sixth place

Third and fourth place

Final

Final standings

See also
2017 Men's Pan American Cup (field hockey)
2017 Women's Indoor Pan American Cup

References

Men's Indoor Pan American Cup
International sports competitions hosted by Guyana
Indoor Pan American Cup
Georgetown, Guyana
Indoor Pan American Cup
Pan American Cup